15,16-dihydrobiliverdin:ferredoxin oxidoreductase is an enzyme that catalyzes the following chemical reaction

15,16-dihydrobiliverdin + oxidized ferredoxin  biliverdin IXalpha + reduced ferredoxin

The two substrates of this enzyme are 15,16-dihydrobiliverdin and oxidized ferredoxin, whereas its two products are biliverdin IXalpha and reduced ferredoxin.

Classification 
15,16-dihydrobiliverdin:ferredoxin oxidoreductase belongs to the family of oxidoreductases, specifically those acting on the CH-CH group of donor with an iron-sulfur protein as acceptor.  The systematic name of this enzyme class is 15,16-dihydrobiliverdin:ferredoxin oxidoreductase. This enzyme is also called PebA.  This enzyme participates in porphyrin and chlorophyll metabolism.

References 

 

EC 1.3.7
Enzymes of unknown structure